was a province of Japan in the area of southern Shikoku. Tosa bordered on Awa to the northeast, and Iyo to the northwest. In terms of the Gokishichidō system, Tosa was one of the provinces of the Nankaidō circuit. Under the Engishiki classification system, Tosa was ranked as one of the "middle countries" (中国) in terms of importance, and one of the "far countries" (遠国) in terms of distance from the capital. The provincial capital was located in what is now the city of Nankoku. The ichinomiya of the province is the Tosa shrine located in the city of  Kōchi.

History
Tosa Province was formed by the Ritsuryo reforms by combining the territories of the Tosa kuni no miyatsuko (都佐国造) who ruled in the east with the Hata kuni no miyatsuko (波多国造) who ruled in the west. The name "Tosa" appears in the Nihon Shoki in an entry dated Match 675. In many subsequent entries, Tosa is mentioned usually in connection with some natural disaster, including the 684 Hakuhō earthquake in which it was reported that a ship carrying the provincial governor had been swept away by a tsunami, and a new imperial governor was sent from the capital. The province appears to have been used as a penal colony or place of exile from the Asuka period. At the end of the Heian period, Minamoto no Mareyoshi, the younger brother of Minamoto no Yoritomo was exile by the Heike clan. Other prominent exiles included Fujiwara no Moronaga, Emperor Tsuchimikado, and Prince Takanaga. In the Kamakura period, the Ichijō family of court nobles established a huge shōen landed estate in western Tosa, and ruled the area into the Sengoku period. During the Muromachi period, the Hosokawa clan were shugo of Tosa Province, but preferred to rule via proxy, using the Ohira clan, while remaining in Kyoto. When income from the manor tended to stop due to the Onin War, Kanpaku Ichijo Norifusa (with help of the Ohira clan) relocated to Tosa and became a local power controlling Hata and Takaoka Counties in western Tosa. The remainder of the province and controlled by the Motoyama, Aki, Kira, Tsuno, Chōsokabe and the Kosokabe clans. Under Chōsokabe Motochika, the Chōsokabe came to control all of Tosa, and later, to expand into all of Shikoku. They were stopped only by the forces of Toyotomi Hideyoshi, who restricted them only to their territories in Tosa Province. Chōsokabe Motochika's son Chōsokabe Morichika was dispossessed as he sided with the losing Western army at the Battle of Sekigahara in 1600. Under the Tokugawa shogunate, the province was assigned to Yamauchi Kazutoyo and the Yamauchi clan continued to rule the province as daimyō of Tosa Domain until the Meiji restoration. Under theYamauchi, Kōchi Castle was built and the jōkamachi of Kochi city became the capital of the province. During the Bakumatsu period, many prominent people active in the overthrow of the shogunate and the early Meiji government, including Sakamoto Ryōma, Nakaoka Shintarō, Itagaki Taisuke, Gotō Shōjirō. 

Per the early Meiji period , an official government assessment of the nation’s resources, the province had 348 villages with a total kokudaka of 494,087 koku. Tosa Province consisted of the following districts:

Following the abolition of the han system in 1871, Tosa Province became Kochi Prefecture.

The Imperial Japanese Navy battleship Tosa, lead ship of its class, was named after the province.

Gallery

Notes

References
 Nussbaum, Louis-Frédéric and Käthe Roth. (2005).  Japan encyclopedia. Cambridge: Harvard University Press. ;  OCLC 58053128

External links 

  Murdoch's map of provinces, 1903

Former provinces of Japan
Tosa Province
History of Kōchi Prefecture
1871 disestablishments in Japan
States and territories disestablished in 1871